Eolepidopterix is an extinct genus of moths within the family Eolepidopterigidae, containing one species, Eolepidopterix jurassica, which is known from Russia. The fossil remains are dated to the Upper Jurassic-Lower Cretaceous.

References 

Eolepidopterigoidea
Fossil Lepidoptera
Fossils of Russia
Late Jurassic insects
†